Tomislav Ivić (30 June 1933 – 24 June 2011) was a Croatian professional football player and manager. Often described as a brilliant strategist, Ivić is credited with helping develop the modern style of the game. In April 2007, Italian sports daily La Gazzetta dello Sport proclaimed him as the most successful football manager in history, due to his seven league titles won in five countries.

Managerial career

Ivić managed teams in 14 countries along with four national teams, and he won titles and cups in seven countries: Yugoslavia, the Netherlands, Belgium, Portugal, Spain and France. Ivić never won the league title in Greece.

Ivić won seven top flight championships (three in Yugoslavia and one each in the Netherlands, Belgium, Portugal and France); six national cups (four in Yugoslavia and one each in Spain and Portugal); an UEFA Super Cup and an Intercontinental Cup.

In Croatia, Ivić coached RNK Split, Hajduk Split, Dinamo Zagreb and the Croatia national team; in the Netherlands, Ajax; in Belgium, Anderlecht and Standard Liège; in Turkey, Galatasaray and Fenerbahçe; in Italy, Avellino; in Greece, Panathinaikos; in Portugal, Porto and Benfica; in France, Paris Saint-Germain and Marseille (the latter, his last club before retiring in 2002); in Spain, Atlético Madrid; in the United Arab Emirates, Al Wasl and the UAE national team; and in Iran, Persepolis and the Iran national selection.

European and international club competitions
He took Hajduk Split to the European Cup quarter final two times: 1975–76 and in 1979–80, he also reached it with Ajax in 1977–78. His biggest achievement in the European Cup was reaching the semi-finals during the 1981–82 season with Anderlecht. With Porto he won the 1987 European Super Cup and the 1987 Intercontinental Cup.

Ivić has one of the best Champions League win ratios, having won 29 out of 46 matches with a ratio of 63.0%.

International career
He was national team head coach of Yugoslavia, Iran, United Arab Emirates and even Croatia for one match as caretaker manager subbing in for Miroslav Blažević.

While UAE head coach, Ivić lost the 1996 AFC Asian Cup final against Saudi Arabia on penalties.

Retirement
In 2001, under the advisement of his doctor Ivić retired from coaching so he could be under less stress. Three years later he coached Al-Ittihad Club for a season before taking up the youth selections of Standard Liège.

Death
Ivić died on 24 June 2011, six days before his 78th birthday, in his hometown of Split. He was reportedly suffering from cardiac troubles, as well as diabetes.

Managerial statistics

Club

 *Dates of first and last games under Ivić not dates of official appointments

National teams

 *Dates of first and last games under Ivić; not dates of official appointments

Honours

Manager
Hajduk Split (Youth)
 Yugoslav Youth Cup: 1970, 1971, 1972

Hajduk Split
 Yugoslav First League: 1973–74, 1974–75, 1978–79
 Yugoslav Cup: 1971–72, 1973, 1974, 1975–76

Ajax
 Eredivisie: 1976–77

Anderlecht
 Belgian First Division: 1980–81

Porto
 Primeira Liga: 1987–88
 Taça de Portugal: 1988
 European Super Cup: 1987
 Intercontinental Cup: 1987

Marseille
 French Division 1: 1991–92

Al-Ittihad
Saudi Crown Prince Cup: 2004

United Arab Emirates
 AFC Asian Cup runner-up: 1996

Individual
Hajduk Split golden badge: 1975
Golden badge and charter by the city of Paris awarded by Jacques Chirac: 1990
Croatian Olympic Committee trophy: 2003
Most successful manager in history by La Gazzetta dello Sport: 2007
Split sports house hall of fame: 2009
Heart of Hajduk Award: 2011 (postmortem)
World Soccer 36th Greatest Manager of All Time: 2013
France Football 42nd Greatest Manager of All Time: 2019

Orders
  Order of Danica Hrvatska with face of Franjo Bučar – 1995

References

Further reading

External links
 
 Managerial stats
 Tomislav Ivić managerial stats
 Croatia statistics

|-

1933 births
2011 deaths
Footballers from Split, Croatia
Association football midfielders
Yugoslav footballers
RNK Split players
HNK Hajduk Split players
Yugoslav First League players
Yugoslav football managers
RNK Split managers
HNK Šibenik managers
Yugoslavia national football team managers
HNK Hajduk Split managers
AFC Ajax managers
R.S.C. Anderlecht managers
Galatasaray S.K. (football) managers
GNK Dinamo Zagreb managers
U.S. Avellino 1912 managers
Panathinaikos F.C. managers
FC Porto managers
Paris Saint-Germain F.C. managers
Atlético Madrid managers
Olympique de Marseille managers
Croatian football managers
S.L. Benfica managers
Croatia national football team managers
Fenerbahçe football managers
United Arab Emirates national football team managers
Al-Wasl F.C. managers
Persepolis F.C. managers
Iran national football team managers
Standard Liège managers
Ittihad FC managers
1996 AFC Asian Cup managers
Eredivisie managers
Ligue 1 managers
La Liga managers
Süper Lig managers
Yugoslav expatriate football managers
Expatriate football managers in the Netherlands
Yugoslav expatriate sportspeople in the Netherlands
Expatriate football managers in Belgium
Yugoslav expatriate sportspeople in Belgium
Expatriate football managers in Turkey
Yugoslav expatriate sportspeople in Turkey
Expatriate football managers in Italy
Yugoslav expatriate sportspeople in Italy
Expatriate football managers in Greece
Yugoslav expatriate sportspeople in Greece
Expatriate football managers in Portugal
Expatriate football managers in France
Yugoslav expatriate sportspeople in France
Expatriate football managers in Spain
Yugoslav expatriate sportspeople in Spain
Croatian expatriate football managers
Croatian expatriate sportspeople in Turkey
Expatriate football managers in the United Arab Emirates
Croatian expatriate sportspeople in the United Arab Emirates
Expatriate football managers in Iran
Croatian expatriate sportspeople in Iran
Croatian expatriate sportspeople in Belgium
Croatian expatriate sportspeople in France
Expatriate football managers in Saudi Arabia
Croatian expatriate sportspeople in Saudi Arabia
Deaths from diabetes
Burials at Lovrinac Cemetery
Croatian expatriate sportspeople in Portugal